The Ojibwe language is an Algonquian American Indian language spoken throughout the Great Lakes region and westward onto the northern plains. It is one of the largest American Indian languages north of Mexico in terms of number of speakers, and exhibits a large number of divergent dialects. For the most part, this article describes the Minnesota variety of the Southwestern dialect. The orthography used is the Fiero Double-Vowel System.

Like many American languages, Ojibwe is polysynthetic, meaning it exhibits a great deal of synthesis and a very high morpheme-to-word ratio (e.g., the single word for "they are Chinese" is aniibiishaabookewininiiwiwag, which contains six morphemes: leaf-liquid-make-man-be-PLURAL, or approximately "they are leaf-drink [i.e., tea] makers"). It is agglutinating, and thus builds up words by stringing morpheme after morpheme together, rather than having several affixes which carry numerous different pieces of information.

Like most Algonquian languages, Ojibwe distinguishes two different kinds of third person, a proximate and an obviative. The proximate is a traditional third person, while the obviative (also frequently called "fourth person") marks a less important third person if more than one third person is taking part in an action. In other words, Ojibwe uses the obviative to avoid the confusion that could be created by English sentences such as "John and Bill were good friends, ever since the day he first saw him" (who saw whom?). In Ojibwe, one of the two participants would be marked as proximate (whichever one was deemed more important), and the other marked as obviative.

Gender
The gender distinction in Ojibwe is not a masculine/feminine contrast, but is rather between animate and inanimate. Animate nouns are generally living things, and inanimate ones generally nonliving things, although that is not a simple rule because of the cultural understanding as to whether a noun possesses a "spirit" or not (generally, if it can move, it possesses a "spirit"). Objects with great spiritual importance for the Ojibwe, such as rocks, are very often animate rather than inanimate, for example. Some words are distinguished purely by their noun class; for example, mitig, if it is animate (plural mitigoog), means "tree;" if it is inanimate (plural mitigoon), it means "stick."

Number
Number in Ojibwe is a simple singular/plural contrast. Nouns and pronouns can be either singular or plural, and verbs inflect for the number of their subject and object, although some nouns and verbs lack singular forms. Plural forms differ from word to word depending on the word's gender, root, and historical stress. By examining the plural form of the word, one can generally determine the word's gender and root. Animate plurals end in -g, while inanimate plural nouns (and obviative nouns) end in -n. The underlying form of a root determines the "linking vowel" — the vowel that appears before the plural suffix (-g or -n) but after the root itself.

Person
There are seven Ojibwe inflectional categories expressing person/gender combinations for each of the two numbers (singular and plural).  However, the singular and plural categories do not always exactly correspond.  The total number of 14 "persons" arises from taking into consideration all the contrasts of animate/inanimate, proximate/obviative, and singular/plural.

Animate gender (singular)
 X — unspecified actor
 1 — first person singular
 2 — second person singular
 3 — third person, animate
 3’ — animate obviative, or fourth person, animate
 3’’ — third person animate, possessed by obviative
Animate gender (plural)
 1p — first person plural, exclusive
 21 — first person plural, inclusive
 2p — second person plural
 3p — third person plural, animate
 3’p — third person plural, animate  obviative, or animate fourth person proximate plural
Inanimate gender
 0 — third person singular, inanimate
 0’ — third person singular, inanimate obviative
 0p — third person plural, inanimate
 0’p — third person plural, inanimate obviative

Characteristics of the resulting 14 persons are built into Ojibwe nouns and pronouns, thus dictating which verb forms would be used in speech.  In nouns and verbs, all 14 forms of persons may or may not present themselves, as words are divided as either animate or inanimate genders and very few words exist as both, but all 14 forms of persons generally do appear with pronouns.

Pronouns
Ojibwe pronouns, along with distinguishing singular and plural number and first, second, third, and fourth (obviative) persons, also carry a distinction between inclusive and exclusive first person plural. Pronouns may present themselves either as independent words or as series of prefixes and suffixes.

An inclusive first person plural indicates that the pronoun includes the addressee, i.e., "we including you" (giinawind). An exclusive first person plural indicates that the addressee is not included, i.e., "we excluding you" (niinawind).

The other personal pronouns are the first singular niin, second singular giin, third singular wiin, second plural giinawaa, and third plural wiinawaa.

Like the independent words, Ojibwe pronominal prefixes indicate first person with n-, second person with g- and third person with w-.  However, the associated suffixes for these persons will be different depending on if the word is a verb or a noun.

In many Ojibwe-speaking communities, the first person prefix is used without the initial n.  Due to vowel syncope in some communities, those prefixes are further reduced without the initial i.  However, among Saulteaux communities, the first person prefix nim- and nin- are instead reduced to ni-, nind- to nid- and nindo- to nido-.

Ojibwe also has a set of demonstrative pronouns, distinguishing animate/inanimate, here/there/yonder/over here, singular/plural, and proximate/obviative. The demonstratives differ in their phonetic forms very significantly across Ojibwe dialects and communities, so this table, based on the Minnesota dialect of Southwestern Ojibwe, will not be entirely correct for many speakers:

Ojibwe also has a set of "indefinite" pronouns (awiiya, "someone", gegoo, "something," both of which can be preceded by gaawiin or akina to mean "no one, nothing" and "everyone, everything," respectively).

In contrast to the Southwestern Ojibwe's demonstrative pronouns, Central Ojibwe, Northwestern Ojibwe and Western Ojibwe—which includes a larger set of obviatives—have a larger set of demonstratives:

Verbs
Ojibwe verbs mark information not only on the subject (their animacy, person, and plurality) but also on the object. There are several different classes of verbs in the language, which differ based on whether they are transitive or intransitive and whether they take animate or inanimate subjects. These are the main classes:

Verbs mark tenses with prefixes (a'-, aorist past, gii'-, simple past, ga(d)- and da-, future, and wii'-, desiderative future), but also can take a myriad of affixes known as "preverbs", which convey a great amount of additional information about an action. For example, the preverb izhi- means "in such a way," and so its addition to the verb root -ayaa-, "to be," makes the verb izhi-ayaa, "to be a certain way." The preverb bimi-, "along," combines with the verb root -batoo-, "to run," to form bimibatoo, "to run along, run by."  The preferred order of these prefixes are personal prefix, tense prefix, directional prefix, relative prefix, any number of preverbs, and finally the verb.  In addition, the initial syllable may be modified by an initial vowel change or by an initial syllable reduplication.

Furthermore, there are three so-called "orders" of Ojibwe verbs. The basic one is called Independent Order, and is simply the indicative mood. There is also a Conjunct Order, which is most often used with verbs in subordinate clauses, in questions (other than simple yes-no questions), and with participles (participles in Ojibwe are verbal nouns, whose meaning is roughly equivalent to "someone who is (VERB), does (VERB)," for example, the word for "traveler," bebaamaadizid, is the third singular conjunct of babaamaadizi, "to travel about," and literally means "someone who travels about"). The final order is the Imperative Order, used with commands and corresponding to the imperative mood.

Negatives are generally introduced by the leading word gaawiin, which is usually translated as "no," before introducing the actual words in their negative form. Negatives are generally formed by adding sii (or zii) for independent order and si (or zi) for conjunct order, both adding the negative element immediately after the root but before other suffixes.  The sii/si are found after vowels while the zii/zi are found after n.  In some words, the final consonant is dropped and the sii/si are added to the remaining vowel, in other words the final m is converted to n before adding zii/zi, yet in other words a linking vowel i (or aa) is added after the final consonant and then the sii/si added.  Imperatives do not follow the sii (zii)/si (zi) pattern.

There are three imperatives in Ojibwe: the immediate imperative, used to indicate that the action must be completely right away (nibaan!, "Sleep (right now)!"), the delayed imperative, used to indicate that the action should be completely eventually, but not immediately (nibaakan!, "Sleep (in a little bit)!"), and the prohibitive imperative, used to indicate that the action is prohibited ((gego) nibaaken!, "Don't sleep!").  Like the negatives, the "k" in -k, -ken, -keg and -kegon take on the lenis form and become "g" after n.  Also like the negatives, the general the connector vowel between the imperative suffix and the terminal consonant here is i; however, for k/g, the connector vowel instead is o.

All verbs can also be marked for four "modes:" indicative (neutral), dubitative (the speaker is unsure about the validity of what they are saying, for example: bakade, "he is hungry," but bakadedog, "he must be hungry; he could be hungry"), preterit (which emphasizes that the action occurred in the past, and is also used to refer to attempted or intended but uncompleted actions, for example: imaa ninamadab, "I'm sitting there," but imaa ninamadabiban, "I was sitting there; I meant to sit there"), or preterit-dubitative (which expresses doubt about a past action: imaa namadabigoban, "she must have sat there; she could have sat there").

Intransitives
As an example of some of the Ojibwe verbal distinctions at work, consider the conjugation of positive and negative indicative long-vowel-final VAI verbs (using the example nibaa, "to sleep"):

Also as an example of some of the Ojibwe verbal distinctions at work, consider the conjugation of positive and negative indicative long-vowel-final VII verbs (using the example ozhaawashkwaa, "to blue"). Note that unlike VAI verbs, VII do not have imperatives:

 

Passives in intransitives can be expressed by using the INVERSE marker igw, which may undergo a minor structural modification. Some examples of verb final containing the INVERSE marker igw are:

Transitives
Ojibwe, as with other Algonquian languages, also exhibits a direct–inverse system, in which transitive verbs are marked for whether or not the direction of the action follows a "topicality hierarchy" of the language. The topicality hierarchy in Ojibwe is 2 > 1 > X > 3 > 3’ > 0, determined by 1) person, 2) gender, and 3) obviation. Ojibwe has no case distinctions among agent, patient and experiencer theta roles, so in a transitive verb with two participants, the only way to distinguish subject from object is through direct/inverse/goal suffixes.

Note: C, N, nN, S and Y are used in some of the tables below to indicate a generic consonant, n\zh varying consonant, n\nzh varying consonant, s\sh varying consonant, and Ø\i varying palatializer, respectively.

The local goals, non-local goals and reflective cause the stem to undergo minor adjustments:

1. In Oji-Cree (Severn Ojibwe) language, in Algonquin language, and in some Central Ojibwa language (especially in North of Superior Ojibwe)

Transitive verbs can become VAI class of verbs by adding the actor-focused DETRANSITIVE marker ige, which modifies the stem in a similar fashion as the INVERSE marker igw. However, due to differences in dialects, how the actor-focused DETRANSITIVE marker ige may show up differently.

For the first person and second person GOALs, their ACTORs are specified if the words are in their Independent Order, and can also be known as local direct (first person GOAL) and local inverse (second person GOAL). A DIRECT suffix indicates that the action is performed by someone higher on the person hierarchy on someone lower on the person hierarchy (e.g., by the addressee on the speaker, or by a proximate third person on an obviative):

An inverse suffix indicates that the action is performed by someone lower on the person hierarchy on someone higher on the person hierarchy (e.g., by the speaker on the addressee, or by an obviative third person on a proximate):

As can be seen, the only difference between these two verbs is the direct–inverse opposition, rather than case markers (or word order, when distinct nominals are used). An inverse verb is not equivalent to a passive verb. There is a separate passivity marker, denoted in literature as "indefinite person (X)", ranked in topicality hierarchy below first and second persons, but higher than animate and inanimate third persons:

To illustrate this, a generic VTA and VTI paradigm table, arranged by person hierarchy, is shown below. Note that the reflexive forms shown in a darker background with the reflexive theme /-idizo/ happen to be VAI. The table depicts only the paradigm for Independent Order, Positive Voice, Neutral Mode. Letters omitted in a particular form are indicated with that letter struck-through.

Preverbs
Ojibwe language is rich in its use of preverbs, which is a prefix that comes before verbs, nouns, and particles, to provide an additional layer of meaning. In Ojibwe, there are four classes of preverbs ranked in importance by six degrees:
 class 1—tense, aspect, mode, or syntactic prefix appearing on verbs
 mode-subordinator: 
 subordinator: e-, gaa-, waa-
 modal: ga[d]-, da-, daa-, ji-, ge[d]-.
 tense-negativity
 tense: a'- [e'-], gii'- [gaa'-], wii'- [waa'-].
 negativity: aano-, bwaa-.
 class 2—directional prefix occurring on verbs
 class 3—relational prefix occurring on verbs (and on some nouns and particles): ako- [eko-], onji- [wenji-], izhi- [ezhi-], apiichi- [epiichi-], dazhi- [endazhi-], daso- [endaso-].
 class 4—lexical prefix occurring on verbs, nouns, or particles.
 aspectual
 manner, degree, quality/evaluative, quantitative/numeric

Preverbs, when they occur before a noun, are called a prenoun. Preverb class units when written are separated with a hyphen, with the exception of the class 4 preverb indicating manner, degree, quality/evaluative, or quantitative/numeric, which can also serve as functional part of a word stem as an initial. If several preverbs of the same class occur, they are written as a single block in order of rank of importance, with the most important preverb located closest to the word. Pronominal prefixes are written directly onto the head of the word group, so it may be found attached directly to the preverb if a preverb is present. When constructed, an Ojibwe word (in the example below, a verb) may have some or all of the pieces in the following form:

Example, using nibaa, "to sleep"

Nouns
Nouns distinguish plurality, animacy, obviation, and case with suffixes. Animacy is only overtly marked on plural nouns. There are no core cases to distinguish categories such as "subject" or "object", but rather various oblique cases, including a locative (e.g., wiisiniwigamig, "restaurant", wiisiniwigamigong, "in the restaurant") and a vocative plural (e.g., Ojibwedog, "(you) Ojibwes!"). Other suffixes are: pejorative (e.g., jiimaan, "canoe", jiimaanish, "worthless canoe"), diminutive (e.g., zhooniyaa, "money", zhooniyaans, "coin"), contemptive (e.g., odaabaan, "car", odaabaanenh, "just some old car"), preterit (which marks a deceased or no-longer existent person or object, e.g. nookomis, "my grandmother", nookomisiban, "my late grandmother"), and preterit-dubitative (which marks a deceased or no-longer existent person or object which was never known by the speaker, e.g. a'aw mindimooyenh, "that old woman", a'aw mindimooyenyigoban, "that late old woman I never knew").

Some nouns are considered "dependent" and cannot be presented by themselves.  Instead, these dependent nouns are presented with pronoun prefixes/suffixes attached to them.  An example of a dependent noun is nookomis ("my grandmother") where the dependent root -ookomis- ("grandmother") must be presented with a pronoun affix, which in this case is n-.

Verb to noun transforms
Other nouns are derived from verbs by transforming them to their participle form.  Of the choices, third person (and thus third person plural) is the most common form.  Though each class of verbs may have their own participle-forming patterns, for simplicity, only the VAI neutral mode, positive participles are shown in the example, again, using nibaa ("sleep").

Note: C, V, and VV are used in some of the tables below to indicate a generic consonant, a generic short vowel, and a generic long vowel, respectively.

* For participles, the word experiences initial vowel change.
1 -nh in Odaawaa.

Verbs additionally can be transformed into nouns representing concepts by adding -win, or into nouns representing an object by adding -gan or -n, or if a VAI into a gerund by dropping the final vowel or if VAI2 by adding -o.

Plurals and obviative
Plurals and obviative suffixes are the easiest to add to Ojibwe words.  By examining the plural, one can generally determine the underlying root of the word.  Generally, animate plurals end with -g, while inanimate plurals and obviatives end with -n.  Often, a linking vowel is required to join the root to one of these endings.  Underlying -w or -y or an augment may affect the choice of linking vowels.

1 In Central Ojibwa, Northwestern Ojibwa and Western Ojibwa, singular obviative ends with " n " while plural obviative ends with " ' ". This distinction in obviative is not made in other Ojibwe language dialects.
2 In Eastern Ojibwe language and in the Ottawa language, contemptive plurals are CVVnyig and CVVnyin instead of CVVnyag and CVVnyan.
3 In Oji-Cree language, this is a " j " and not a " d ".

Diminutives and contemptives
Diminutives in Ojibwe express an idea of something that is smaller or younger version of the noun.  All diminutives are treated as a Consonant Stem when made into one of the plural forms or into the obviative form, thus taking on the linking vowel -a-.  Contemptives are formed in a similar fashion as diminutives and are used to express negative or depreciative attitude the speaker may have of the noun.  Contemptive plurals and obviatives remain as contemptives, but can take on the linking vowel -i- to add a possible pejorative.  Many words to express fauna are often in contemptive forms.  In the Ojibwemowin spoken in Wisconsin and certain areas of northwestern Ontario, often contemptives are reduced from -nh/-ny- forms to -ø/-y-; in Algonquin and in most Northwestern Ojibwe, the contemptives instead is reflected by -nzh.  In Odaawaa, the frequency of contemptives in fauna are higher than in other Anishinaabemowin dialects.  For example, it is from the Daawaamwin word jidmoonh ("red squirrel") where the English word "chipmunk" has its origins, while the same word in Ojibwemowin is ajidamoo.  When contemptive suffix is added for terms of endearment, any other d, t, z and s in the word are changed to j, ch, zh and sh respectively.

Locatives, possessives and obviation possessor theme
Locatives indicate a location, and are indicated with -ng.  Locatives do not take on any plurals or obviative suffixes, but obviation possessor or the number can be added before the locative suffix.  Another set of affixes in the Anishinaabe language is indicated by the possessive theme -m or the obviative possessor theme -ni.  Generally, dependent nouns and nouns ending with either -m or -n do not take the possessive theme -m.  A small group of nouns also do not ever take the possessive theme suffix.

Rarely do either the possessive theme -m or the obviative possessor theme -ni stand by themselves.  The above examples for the possessive theme -m were for the first person singular.  For other persons or number, again using the possessive theme -m as an example, the word is conjugated as following:

1 In the Algonquin, the plural suffix remains as -an/-ag, rather than becoming -in/-ig.
2 Terminal -n is not found in Algonquin language.
3 Terminal -n is not found in Potawatomi, Eastern Ojibwe and Ottawa languages.
4 In the Potawatomi language
5 -in is used in Algonquin and Oji-Cree (Severn Ojibwe) languages
6 Only in Algonquin and in OjiCree is the inanimate possessed by an obviate marked.
7 Historically

Pejoratives and vocative plurals
Pejoratives, marked with the -sh suffix, generally indicates a stronger negative feelings a speaker may have than that of the contemptive.  However, pejorative may also indicate a term of affection.  Some words take on different meaning in the pejorative, such as aniibiish, which means "no good elm" but also means "leaf".  In some dialects, some words are always shown in their pejorative forms, such as animosh for "dog".

Vocative plurals mimic pejorative conjugation patterns.  It is identified with the -dog suffix, which in the Ottawa dialect shows up instead as -dig suffix.

When the diminutive suffix ens or the affective suffix is, is followed by the other,  the s becomes z, as in izens or enzis.  When the pejorative suffix ish is added to the diminutive suffix ens, combination yields enzhish, while adding the diminutive suffix ens to the pejorative suffix ish, just as with any other Consonant Stem patterns, yields ishens. In Northwestern Ojibwe dialect when the pejorative suffix ish is added, any other d, t, z and s in the word are changed to j, ch, zh and sh respectively.

Singular vocatives do not follow a systematic pattern like plural vocatives do, with various strategies in achieving the vocative case:

However, many irregular forms of achieving the vocative case also exist, including in some dialects unchanged forms such as noozhishenh! (my grandchild) used as a vocative, and vocative beyond the regular changed forms such as ninge! (my mother).

Adjectives
Ojibwe has no adjectives per se but verbs that function as adjectives. Thus, instead of saying "the flower is blue," Ojibwe says something like to "the flower blues" (ozhaawashkwaa waabigwan) or "be a blueing flower" (waabigwan-ozhaawashkwaa). Ojibwe has a copula, in some situations, which has a verb (several, in fact) that can be translated as "to be" and used in situations to equate one thing with another. However, a copula is not always used in Ojibwe, such as if demonstrative pronouns are used (jiimaan o'ow, "this is a canoe").

Adverbs

Particles
Ojibwe language with its iambic accent system and relatively atonal word stresses, has any nuance of expressing word emphasis, stress, mood, etc., being expressed by particles like these:
 mii — discourse sequencer, topical focuser
 (i)dash — topical shift indicator; may even appear as -sh
 (i)go — emphasises heightened assertiveness
 (i)sa — emphasises novelty
 (i)sha — emphasises contradiction
 (i)maa — emphasises cooperation (either actual or desired)
 (i)naa — emphasises evaluative information
 wii — unexpectedness indicator
The short initial 'i' is omitted typically when following a word or particle ending in a vowel or ending in 'n'.

Other particles may be interjections like these:
 ambe — "come on..."
 (a)tayaa — "indeed"
 (a)was — "go away"
 boozhoo — "hello"
 enh — "yes"
 gaawiin — "no"
 (i)kawe — "hold on..."
 miigwech — "thank you"
The short initial vowel may be omitted typically in excited speech.

Counting
Ojibwe numbers are classified as a biquinary base-10 system.

1 In theory
2 Historically, either niizh midana or niizhidana.
3 Many speakers omit the initial n (shown in parentheses).
4 In Algonquin and Algonquin-influenced communities, new and newin midana are used instead of niiwin and niimidana, respectively.
5 In Northwestern Ojibwe, Oji-cree, and Algonquin, o is used instead of i as the connector vowel for the suffixes -midana and -midanaak.
6 In some dialects, such as in parts of Eastern Ojibwe, zhaang is used instead of zhaangaswi; the shorter form was historically recorded as being the more pervasive form, but it now is rarely used.
7 Richard Rhodes reports that some Algonquin speakers use a connector, -di, before -swi, -somidana, and -somidanaak.
8 (n)ingod is "one" in Potawatomi but "something" in Ojibwe.

Modifications of sound
Ojibwe initials of words may experience morphological changes under three modification strategies: initial consonant change, initial vowel change and initial syllable reduplication.

Initial consonant change
Ojibwe consonants are divided into lenis and fortis values:
 lenis-fortis pairs: ′ – h, b-p, d-t, g-k, j-ch, z-s, zh-sh
 unpaired fortis: m, n, w, y 

When either the past tense preverb gii'- or the desiritive future tense wii'- is added to a verb, if the verb begins with a lenis consonant, it may change to its fortis counterpart; it is common for many writers to omit the writing of the glottal stop, so they graphically indicate this consonant shift by writing the fortis consonant counterpart. In some dialects, such as with the Red Lake Ojibwe in Minnesota, this rule is suspended if the consonant in the verb's second syllable already contains a fortis consonant. In some dialects as in Odaawaa, this rule is not applied.

Initial vowel change
In general, verbs in Conjunct and Participial orders and nouns of Subjunctive order change the vowel quality of the first syllable in the manner shown in the table below.

However, in some words beginning in dan-, dazh-, das-, dash- or daa- instead take on the prefix en- to form endan-, endazh-, endas-, endash- or endaa-.  The directional prefix bi-, meaning "over here," instead becomes ba-.

Initial syllable reduplication
Words typically conveying repetitive actions have their very first syllable experience reduplication.  Reduplication may be found in both verbs and in nouns.  Vowel syncope process Eastern Ojibwe and Odaawaa experiences happen after the word has gone through reduplication.  The most general reduplication pattern for the initial syllable is C1V1 → C1V2C2V1 but the table below shows the most common reduplication strategies.

1 ayo- in Algonquin.

In some words, the reduplicated consonant shifts from their lenis value to their fortis value.  Yet in some stems, initial Cw- retains the -w- while others do not.  Those words experiencing the prefix en- may change to in- before experiencing reduplication. Other prefixes such as gino- (long) does not follow the typical C1V1 → C1V2C2V1 pattern, and instead becomes gagaano-.

Syntax
As Ojibwe is highly synthetic, word order and sentence structure is relatively free, since a great deal of information is already encoded onto the verb. The subject can go before or after the verb, as can the object; however, the subject and the object together cannot go before the verb. In general, whichever participant is deemed more important or in-focus by the speaker is placed first, before the verb, and the less important participant follows the verb. Ojibwe tends to prefer a VS order (verb–subject) when subjects are specified with separate nominals or pronouns (e.g., bakade a'aw asabikeshiinh, be.hungry that.there.ANIMATE net.make.PEJORATIVE.CONTEMPTIVE, "that spider is hungry").

See also
Anishinaabe language

Notes

References
Artuso, Christian. 1998.  Noogom gaa-izhi-anishinaabemonaaniwag: Generational Difference in Algonquin.  M.A. thesis. Department of Linguistics, University of Manitoba.
Kegg, Maude. 1990. Nookomis Gaa-inaajimotawid: What my grandmother Told Me. Bemidji, MN: Indian Studies Publications.
Mithun, Marianne. 1999. The Languages of Native North America. Cambridge: University Press.
Nichols, John D. (ed.). 1988. An Ojibwe Text Anthology. London, ON: Centre for Research and Teaching of Canadian Native Languages.
Nichols, John D. and Earl Nyholm. 1995. A Concise Dictionary of Minnesota Ojibwe. Minneapolis: University of Minnesota Press.
Picard, Marc. 1984. On the Naturalness of Algonquian . International Journal of American Linguistics 50:424-37.
Rhodes, Richard A. 1985. Eastern Ojibwa-Chippewa-Ottawa Dictionary. Berlin: Mouton de Gruyter.

External links
 Ojibwe Language Society
 OLS Miinawaa — Yahoo Group extension of the Ojibwe Language Society
 Rand Valentine's introduction to Ojibwe
 Grammar, lessons, and dictionaries
 Odawa & Eastern Ojibwe Language resources at Algonquian Linguistic Atlas
 Ojibwe People's Dictionary ― on-line dictionary courtesy of University of Minnesota
Freelang Ojibwe Dictionary — Freeware off-line dictionary, updated with additional entries periodically.
 Our Languages: Nakawē (Saskatchewan Indian Cultural Centre)
 Native Languages: A Support Document for the Teaching of Language Patterns, Ojibwe and Cree

 

Native American grammars
Anishinaabe languages
Ojibwe culture
Indigenous languages of the North American eastern woodlands
Indigenous languages of the North American Subarctic
First Nations languages in Canada
Languages of the United States